Jimmy Izquierdo (28 May 1961 – 23 April 1994) was an Ecuadorian footballer. He played in ten matches for the Ecuador national football team from 1988 to 1989. He was also part of Ecuador's squad for the 1989 Copa América tournament.

References

External links
 

1966 births
1994 deaths
Ecuadorian footballers
Ecuador international footballers
Place of birth missing
Association football defenders
Barcelona S.C. footballers
Delfín S.C. footballers